Major-General Udey Chand Dubey (26 March 1909 – 21 April 2009) was an Indian Army general and centenarian.

Early career
Among the first cadets selected to attend the Prince of Wales Royal Indian Military College (now the Rashtriya Indian Military College) in 1922, Dubey was one of three graduates selected for a King's Commission as a King's Commissioned Indian Officer (KCIO) in 1928. He passed out from the Royal Military Academy Sandhurst on 30 January 1930. As was customary, he was posted to a British Army regiment, the Norfolk Regiment, for a period of one year. On 30 March 1931, he was posted to the 2nd Battalion of the 1st Punjab Regiment. Other KCIOs in the battalion at the same time were Kalwant Singh, later also a major-general, and the battalion adjutant Pran Nath Thapar, the future Chief of the Army Staff.

Dubey was promoted lieutenant on 30 April 1932, and was appointed battalion quartermaster on 1 June 1936. He was promoted captain on 1 August 1938, and in April 1939 qualified as a second-class interpreter in Urdu. On 26 March 1940, he was appointed battalion adjutant. In 1941, now an acting major, Dubey was selected to attend the 4th War Course at the Staff College, Quetta, which ran from 21 July to 13 December 1941; among his fellow students was Squadron Leader Subroto Mukerjee.

Post-war and post-Independence
Dubey was promoted substantive major (temporary lieutenant-colonel) on 30 January 1947. As the 1st Punjab was assigned to the new Pakistan Army following Independence and partition, Dubey was transferred to the Dogra Regiment. During the Indo-Pakistani War of 1947–1948, he commanded the regiment's second battalion in the Kashmir Valley, notably at the battle of Uri for which the unit received battle and theatre honours. On 17 December 1949, he was appointed GOC, Rajasthan Union States Forces, with the local rank of major-general. He was promoted substantive colonel on 1 January 1950 and to substantive brigadier on 30 January 1951. Relinquishing his local rank of major-general on 19 May 1951, he was given command of the 5th Infantry Brigade on 1 September.

On 7 October 1952, Dubey was appointed officiating GOC, Bombay Area, with the acting rank of major-general, and was assigned to command the 25th Infantry Division on 31 October 1953. He was promoted substantive major-general on 30 January 1955, and was appointed GOC Delhi Area on 25 July. As GOC Delhi Area, Dubey was principal organiser of the annual Army Day and Republic Day Parades, also staging the Western Command's torchlight tattoo in 1958. On 15 March 1959, he took charge in his final appointment as GOC, U.P. Area, serving in this capacity until his retirement from the Army on 1 June 1960.

Dubey settled in Delhi, where he died on 21 April 2009, nearly a month after his 100th birthday.

Dates of rank

Notes

References

1909 births
2009 deaths
Indian generals
Indian military personnel of World War II
British Indian Army officers
Indian Army officers
Indian Army personnel of World War II
People of the Indo-Pakistani War of 1947
People of the 1947 Kashmir conflict
Graduates of the Royal Military Academy Sandhurst
Indian centenarians